United States v. Shoshone Tribe of Indians of the Wind River Reservation in Wyoming, 304 U.S. 111 (1938), was a United States Supreme Court case in which the Court held that mineral rights on a reservation belonged to the tribe, not the federal government.

Background
By the Treaty of July 2, 1863 the United States set apart for the Shoshone Tribe of Indians of the Wind River Reservation, a reservation of  located in Colorado, Utah, Idaho, and Wyoming. By the Treaty of July 3, 1868, the tribe ceded this reservation to the United States. The US agreed that  definitely described acres called the "district of country" would be set aside for the absolute and undisturbed use and occupation of the Shoshone Indians. The US also agreed that no persons would be permitted to pass over, settle upon, or reside in that territory. The Shoshone Tribe subsequently made the reservation their permanent home.

At the time the 1868 Treaty was made, the tribe consisted of full-blood Indians who were unable to read, write, or speak English. In 1904, the Shoshones and Arapahoes ceded to the US  to be held by it in trust for the sale of timber, timber lands, and for the making of leases. The net proceeds were to be credited to the Indians. There were  allotted to members of the tribes from 1907 to 1919.

The lower court concluded that the tribe's interest in the land by the Treaty of 1868 included ownership of the mineral and timber rights. The Government appealed to the Supreme Court and asked for reversal with directions to determine the value of the Indians' right of use and occupancy excluding the value of any timber or minerals.

Opinion of the Court
Justice Pierce Butler delivered the opinion of the court. The case was argued March 21 and April 18, 1938 and was decided on April 25, 1938. The Supreme Court affirmed the lower court ruling and held that by the Treaty of 1868 the Shoshone Tribe had acquired the mineral and timber rights of the reservation. The Court reasoned that the minerals and standing timber were elements of the land itself and that for all practical purposes, the Tribe owned the land. The language of the Treaty did not suggest that the US intended to retain for itself any interest in the minerals or timber. The Court ultimately concluded that the lower court was correct in holding that the right of the Shoshone Tribe included the timber and minerals within the reservation.

Notes

External links
 

1938 in American law
Shoshone
United States Native American case law
United States Supreme Court cases
United States Supreme Court cases of the Hughes Court
1938 in United States case law
Aboriginal title case law in the United States
Native American history of Colorado
Native American history of Utah
Native American history of Idaho
Native American history of Wyoming